The 1972 East Texas State Lions football team represented East Texas State University in the 1972 NAIA Division I football season. They were led by head coach Ernest Hawkins, who was in his ninth season at East Texas State. The Lions played their home games at Memorial Stadium and were members of the Lone Star Conference. The Lions won the Lone Star Conference, the NAIA District IV, and the NAIA Division I National Championship.

Heading into the 1972 season, the Lions were picked to finish fourth in the conference, and started out the season with 14–12 loss to rival , but then racked up six straight wins to climb into the national polls. When the final national rankings came out, the Lions were ranked fourth in the nation and invited to the NAIA Division I playoffs. The Lions routed Central State, 54–0 in the earning them a spot in Champion Bowl against the second-ranked . The title game was determined to be played in Commerce. On a bitterly cold December day in front of a packed Memorial Stadium, Hawkins's Lions defeated Carson–Newman, 21–18, to claim the national title. Among the players on the team were future National Football League (NFL) players Will Cureton, Harvey Martin, Autry Beamon, Aundra Thompson, and Tim Collier. The Lions were named the National Team of the Year and Hawkins was named both Lone Star Conference Coach of the Year and National Coach of the Year.

Schedule

Awards
NAIA Coach of the Year: Ernest Hawkins

All-Americans
Harvey Martin, First Team Defensive Line
Kenneth Parks, First Team, Running Back
Curtis Wester, First Team, Offensive Line
Autry Beamon, Second Team, Defensive Back
Denver Crawley, Honorable Mention, Offensive Tackle 
Dudley Slice, Honorable Mention, Receiver
Ricky Earle, Honorable Mention, Safety

All-Lone Star Conference

LSC Superlatives
Coach of The Year: Ernest Hawkins
Outstanding Lineman: Curts Wester
Outstanding Back: Kenneth Parks

LSC First Team
Autry Beamon, Safety
Denver Crowley, Offensive Line
Will Cureton, Quarterback
Ricky Earle, Safety
Harvey Martin, Defensive End 
Kenneth Parks, Running Back
Dudley Slice, Receiver 
Doug Walker, Linebacker
Curtis Wester, Offensive Line

LSC Second Team
Calvin Harris, Tight End
LeRoy Johnson, Linebacker

LSC Honorable Mention
Kenneth Brown, Offensive tackle
Nelson Robinson, Fullback
James Talbot, Linebacker
Jim Talley, Center
Jackie Woods, Offensive Guard

References

East Texas State
Texas A&M–Commerce Lions football seasons
NAIA Football National Champions
Lone Star Conference football champion seasons
East Texas State Lions football